David Lawrence may refer to:

Arts and entertainment
David Lawrence (composer) (born 1960), American composer of television and film scores such as Descendants 3
David H. Lawrence XVII, American television, film and voice actor
David Lawrence, pseudonym of English poet & TV scriptwriter David Harsent (born 1942)

Printed media
D. H. Lawrence (David Herbert Richards Lawrence, 1885–1930), English novelist
David Lawrence (publisher) (1888–1973), American publisher/editor
David Lawrence (writer), American comic book writer
David Lawrence Jr. (born 1942), American newspaper editor and publisher

Sports
David Lawrence (basketball) (1959–2017), American basketball player
David Lawrence (cricketer) (born 1964), English cricketer
David Lawrence (skier) (born 1930), American alpine skier

Other uses
David L. Lawrence (1889–1966), Governor of Pennsylvania and Pittsburgh mayor

See also
Chi Chi LaRue  Lawrence David (born 1959), porn director and cross dressing drag DJ including Lawrence David
Larry David or Lawrence David (born 1947), American comedian, writer, actor, director, playwright, and television producer